This is a list of castles in Cyprus.

Castles/Fortresses

Map of castles and forts

See also
 List of castles

Cyprus
Cyprus
Castles
Cyprus
Castles